The World Competitiveness Yearbook is an annual report published by the Swiss-based International Institute for Management Development (IMD) on the competitiveness of nations and has been published since 1989. The yearbook benchmarks the performance of 63 countries based on 340 criteria measuring different facets of competitiveness. It uses two types of data:

2/3 hard statistical data (international/national sources)
1/3 survey data (Executive Opinion Survey)

Ranking of countries in 5-year periods

See also

 Global Competitiveness Report
 Competition (companies)

Notes

References 

Economics publications
International rankings
Global economic indicators
Yearbooks